The I Don't Cares are a musical collaboration between Paul Westerberg and Juliana Hatfield that released their debut album Wild Stab in January 2016.

References

External links
 The I Don't Cares entries on Paul Westerberg's blog

American rock music groups